Green Level High School is a public high school located at 7600 Roberts Road in Cary, North Carolina. It is part of the Wake County Public School System.

History
The school opened in 2019. Before Green Level formally opened, it housed students of Apex High School while that school was undergoing renovations. The North Carolina State Senate passed House Bill 55 so that Apex, North Carolina police could have jurisdiction at Green Level High since the school was serving as a temporary location for Apex High students.

The school is four stories tall and has a capacity for 2,262 students.

Student population 
For the 2021-2022 school year, the student population was 1,383. Of those students, 619 (44.8%) are White, 529 (38.3%) Asian, 95 (6.9%) Hispanic, 83 (6%) Black, (3.7%) 51 are two or more races, 3 (0.2%) American Indian, and 3 (0.2%) Native Hawaiian/Pacific Islander.

36 or 3.6% of the students are eligible for the free lunch program and 14 for the reduced-lunch program.

Faculty 
The faculty includes the full-time equivalent of 71.54 teachers. The student/teacher ratio is 19.33 to 1.

The principal of Green Level High School is Karen Summers.

Academics

Curriculum 
Green Level High School included grades 9 through 12. Student may take Advance Placement courses.

Ratings 
Niche gives Green Level a score of A- and a rank of #83 in North Carolina.

Student life

Athletics 
Green Level High School is a Division 4A team associated with the North Carolina High School Athletic Association.

The school has the following co-ed sports teams: varsity competitive cheer, varsity cross country, varsity indoor track, varsity swimming, varsity track, and varsity sideline cheer.

Sport teams for women include varsity basketball, junior varsity basketball, varsity golf, varsity gymnastics,  varsity lacrosse, junior varsity lacrosse, varsity soccer, junior varsity soccer,  varsity softball, junior varsity softball, varsity tennis, varsity volleyball, and junior varsity volleyball.

Men's sport teams include varsity baseball, junior varsity baseball, varsity basketball, junior varsity basketball, varsity football, junior varsity football, varsity golf,  varsity lacrosse, junior varsity lacrosse, varsity soccer, junior varsity soccer, varsity tennis, and varsity wrestling.

State Championships 

 4A Volleyball State Champion, 2022

Clubs and Organizations 
Green Level has several concert bands (typically a concert band, symphonic band, and wind ensemble) as well as a marching band. They have three indoor ensembles, with one Indoor Percussion ensemble and two Winter Guard ensembles (a junior varsity and varsity team). They also have two Jazz bands that require an audition in order to be placed in one of said bands. 

The school also has several choral groups. The Level Singers and the Tenor Bass Chorus do not require auditions, while the Advanced Treble Chorus and Green Level A capella both require auditions. The former three are classes, and the latter is an extracurricular.

Mascot and colors 
The mascot of Green Level High School is the Gator. The school's colors are navy blue, lime green, and white.

Publications 
The student newspaper is called The Gator's Eye. The school's yearbook is the Equilibrium.

References

External links 
 

Public high schools in North Carolina
2019 establishments in North Carolina
Educational institutions established in 2019
Buildings and structures in Cary, North Carolina
Wake County Public School System
Schools in Wake County, North Carolina